Annica Maria Sjölund (born 31 March 1985) is a Finnish football striker, who last played for Kopparbergs/Göteborg FC of Sweden's Damallsvenskan. She previously played for FC United Pietarsaari and Åland United in Finland's Naisten Liiga and Jitex BK, Älvsjö AIK and AIK in Sweden.

Club career

In August 2012 Sjölund sustained an anterior cruciate ligament injury while playing for Jitex in a match against Örebro.

Sjölund left Jitex after the 2013 Damallsvenskan season. She was wanted by former club Åland United, but decided to stay in Sweden with Kopparbergs/Göteborg FC.

International career
She is a member of the Finnish national team; scoring on her debut against Belgium in May 2006. She took part in the 2009 European Championship, where she scored one goal in the quarter-finals against England.

National coach Andrée Jeglertz selected Sjölund in Finland's squad for UEFA Women's Euro 2013, where she scored the team's only goal at the tournament – a late equaliser in a 1–1 draw with Denmark.

Sjölund also represented Åland at the Island Games football tournament in 2001 and 2007.

Personal life

Her brother Daniel Sjölund is also an international footballer.

References

External links

 
 
 

1985 births
Living people
People from Finström
Swedish-speaking Finns
Women's association football forwards
Finnish women's footballers
Finnish expatriate footballers
Expatriate women's footballers in Sweden
Jitex BK players
AIK Fotboll (women) players
Damallsvenskan players
Finland women's international footballers
BK Häcken FF players
FC United (Jakobstad) players
Kansallinen Liiga players
Finnish expatriate sportspeople in Sweden
Åland United players
Älvsjö AIK (women) players
Sportspeople from Åland